Manish Bhargav (born 22 February 1994) is an Indian footballer who plays as a midfielder for Mohun Bagan in the I-League.

Career

Mohun Bagan
After practice two years in the Mohun Bagan Academy, Manish signed on professional terms with Mohun Bagan on 13 January 2012. He then made his debut for Bagan on 22 January 2012 against Prayag United, staying on the pitch till the 41st minute when he was substituted off by Gouranga Dutta.

International
Bhargav made his Indian U23 debut against Uzbekistan U23 on 27 March 2015 in a 2016 AFC U-23 qualifier in the Bangabandhu National Stadium in Bangladesh.

Career statistics

Club

References

Indian footballers
1994 births
Living people
I-League players
Mohun Bagan AC players
Footballers from Punjab, India
Association football wingers